The Disneyland Paris Hotel is a hotel located in Disneyland Paris. Located between Main Street, U.S.A. and Fantasia Gardens, the hotel is situated above the entrance turnstiles and ticket booths for Disneyland Park. The architecture of the hotel references Victorian American hotels, such as the Hotel del Coronado.

Description

History

The hotel opened with the Euro Disney Resort in April 1992, although a refurbishment was announced in April 2021. Disneyland Paris Hotel is a luxury hotel located at the Disneyland Paris resort in Marne-la-Vallée, France. The hotel features a variety of room types, including standard rooms, suites, and family rooms. It offers on-site dining options, a fitness centre, and an outdoor pool. The hotel is conveniently located at the entrance to Disneyland Paris theme park.

Design
The Imagineers who designed the park's Main Street partnered with architecture firm Wimberly Allison Tong & Goo on the project.

Restaurants and Cuisine
The Disneyland Hotel is home to two restaurants and a bar:

California Grill

The California Grill is an haute cuisine restaurant run by chef Philippe Geneletti.

Inventions

Inventions is a buffet-style character dining restaurant inspired by the many inventions of Jules Verne & Leonardo da Vinci. It features a weekly Sunday brunch with a changing theme.

Café Fantasia

Café Fantasia is a piano bar themed to Disney's Fantasia. The bar serves cocktails, coffee, and light dining options throughout the day.

References

External links
Official website

Hotels in Disneyland Paris
Hotels established in 1992
Hotel buildings completed in 1992
1992 establishments in France